The 2000 Big 12 Conference softball tournament was held at ASA Hall of Fame Stadium in Oklahoma City, OK from May 10 through May 13, 2000. Nebraska won their second conference tournament and earned the Big 12 Conference's automatic bid to the 2000 NCAA Division I softball tournament. 

Oklahoma,  and  received bids to the NCAA tournament. Oklahoma would go on to play in the 2000 Women's College World Series.

Oklahoma went on to win the 2000 National Championship.

Standings
Source:

Bracket and results
Source:

Bracket

Opening round

Double-elimination rounds

Game results

All-Tournament Team
Source:

References

Big 12 Conference softball tournament
Tournament
Big 12 softball tournament